Riberi is an Italian surname. Notable people with this surname include:

Bartolomeo Riberi, O. de M. (1640–1702), Italian Roman Catholic Bishop of Nicotera
Alessandro Riberi (1794–1861), Italian surgeon, physician, academic and Italian politician
Antonio Riberi (1897–1967), Monacan Cardinal of the Roman Catholic Church

Italian-language surnames